The Australian cricket team toured New Zealand in the 1976–77 season to play a two-match Test series against New Zealand. Australia won the series 1–0.

Australian squad
The original squad selected was as follows:
Batsmen – Greg Chappell (captain), Ian Davis, Alan Turner, Rick McCosker, Gary Cosier, Doug Walters, Kim Hughes
Fastbowlers – Dennis Lillee, Max Walker, Alan Hurst
Spinners – Ray Bright, Kerry O'Keeffe
All rounders – Gary Gilmour
Wicketkeepers – Rod Marsh
Manager – Roger Wotton

Test series summary

First Test

Second Test

References

External links
Australian cricket team in New Zealand in 1976–77 at Cricinfo
Australia in New Zealand in 1976–77 at CricketArchive

1977 in Australian cricket
1976-77
1977 in New Zealand cricket
New Zealand cricket seasons from 1970–71 to 1999–2000
International cricket competitions from 1975–76 to 1980